Gershom is the firstborn son of Moses.

Gershom may also refer to:
 Gershom ben Judah (c. 960 -1040? -1028?), Rabbeinu Gershom 
 Gershom Browne (1898–2000)
 Gershom Bulkeley (1636–1721), Christian minister and physician
 Gershom Carmichael (1672–1729), Church of Scotland minister
 Gershom Cox (1863–1918), English footballer
 Gershom Bassey (born 1962), Nigerian politician and businessman
 Gershom Gorenberg, American-born Israeli journalist, and blogger
 Gershom Whitfield Guinness (1869–1927), Protestant missionary, doctor, and writer
 Gershom Mott (1822–1884), United States Army officer and General in the Union Army
 Gershom Powers (1789–1831), American politician
 Gershom Schocken (1912–1990), Israeli journalist and politician
 Gershom Scholem (1897–1982), German-born Israeli philosopher and historian
 Gershom Mendes Seixas (1745–1816)
 Gershom Sizomu (born 1972), Ugandan rabbi
 Gershom Stewart (1857–1929)
 Gershom Bradford Weston (1799–1869)
  William Gershom Collingwood (1854–1932), English author and artist
 Yonassan Gershom (born 1947), Rabbi and writer

See also
 
 Gershon (disambiguation)
 Gerson (disambiguation)